Maqsood Aziz (born 20 December 1993) is a Pakistani cricketer. He made his first-class debut for National Bank of Pakistan in the 2017–18 Quaid-e-Azam Trophy on 2 November 2017.

References

External links
 

1993 births
Living people
Pakistani cricketers
Place of birth missing (living people)
National Bank of Pakistan cricketers